A total of 22 nations competed in the men's team event at the 1988 Summer Olympics as part of the archery programme.  The ranking round score for a team was the sum of the three scores earned by the individual archers in the individual ranking round.  The top twelve nations competed in the semifinals, with the top eight advancing to the finals.

Semifinal
In a surprise, the Korean team fell all the way to sixth place in the semifinal.  The United States and Soviet Union each moved up one place into the top two, while Chinese Taipei gave a strong showing in third place.  Britain also moved up substantially in the ranking.

Final
Korea returned to top form in the final, making full use of the clean slate that each round afforded to win the gold medal.  The Americans continued to shoot well, but were unable to keep up with the Koreans, taking home the silver.  The Soviets and the Chinese Taipei team both fell out of medal contention, while Britain continued its climb right up into the bronze medal win.

Result

References

External links
Official Olympic Report

Archery at the 1988 Summer Olympics
1988 in archery
Men's events at the 1988 Summer Olympics